Kapuz is a village in the Beyağaç District of Denizli Province in Turkey.

References

Villages in Beyağaç District